Eprobemide (INN) is a pharmaceutical drug that was used as an antidepressant in Russia (under the brand name Бефол/Befol).  It is a non-competitive reversible inhibitor of monoamine oxidase A that exhibits selective action on serotonin deamination. Eprobemide differs from moclobemide only in the linker that connects the morpholine fragment with the chlorobenzamide — moclobemide has two carbon atoms while eprobemide has three. Its registration was cancelled on December 30, 2003.

References 

Reversible inhibitors of MAO-A
Monoamine oxidase inhibitors
Antidepressants
4-Morpholinyl compunds
Benzamides
Chloroarenes
Russian drugs